Thomas Moore House, also known as the Moore-Christian House, is a historic home located at Indianapolis, Indiana.  It was built in the 19th century, and is a two-story, five bay, "L"-shaped, Italianate style brick dwelling.  It has a low hipped roof with double brackets and segmental arched openings.  At the entrance is a gable roofed awning with large, ornate brackets and ornate Queen Anne style scrollwork design on the gable front.

It was listed on the National Register of Historic Places in 1984.

References

Houses on the National Register of Historic Places in Indiana
Italianate architecture in Indiana
Houses in Indianapolis
National Register of Historic Places in Indianapolis